Midnight Man (also known as Blood for Blood) is a 1995 Direct-To-Video action/martial arts film written by J.B. Lawrence, produced by Alan Amiel and directed by John Weidner. The film stars Lorenzo Lamas, James Lew, and Mako.

Plot
LAPD Detective John Kang (Lamas) dreams of a quiet life with his wife and child, but after a blown surveillance operation, those dreams quickly turn bloody when he is targeted for assassination by a ruthless Cambodian warlord. Plagued by memories of a forgotten childhood and trapped in the middle of a brutal gang war, Kang must fight to save his family as the world's deadliest hitman closes in for the kill.

Cast

Reception
Chris The Brain from Bullets Points Action wrote: "Midnight Man was an enjoyable film that featured a quality cast and some quality martial arts action. But to me it was all the little extras that helped take it from regular Cheeseburger Macaroni to Cheeseburger Macaroni with crumbled bacon on top!" Matt Poirier from Direct to Video Connoisseur gave it a bad review and stated: "It seems like Lamas has more stinkers than classics, and this is definitely in that former category. It wasn't just that it had limited action, it was the crap that went on when there wasn't action that hurt so much. Sometimes these actioners try too hard to be something other than an actioner, and as a result, we get something messier than it had to be." Jack Sommersby from eFilmCritic gave the movie two stars and wrote: "The made-for-cable-TV Midnight Man isn't thrilling or swiftly enough paced to generate much in the way of excitement, and with a rather sodden hero at its center, it's not terribly interesting, either."

References

External links 
 
 
 

1995 action films
1995 independent films
1995 martial arts films
1995 films
American action films
American police detective films
American independent films
1990s English-language films
Fictional portrayals of the Los Angeles Police Department
Films scored by Joel Goldsmith
Films set in Los Angeles
1990s American films